Future Republic (Italian: Repubblica Futura, RF) is a centrist political party in San Marino and one of the five current governing parties in San Marino with Democratic Socialist Left and Civic 10.

The party was formed on the 24th and 25 February 2017 by a merger of the Popular Alliance (AP) and the Union for the Republic (UPR).

The youth wing of the party is Future Generation (Italian: Generazione Futura).

Overview 
For the 2016 election, the Popular Alliance (AP) and the Union for the Republic (UPR) formed a coalition and ran under the winning Adesso.sm alliance. They received 11 seats.

One of the 11 Grand Councillors, Margherita Amici, is part of the delegation of San Marino to the Parliamentary Assembly of the Organization for Security and Co-operation in Europe.

Within the State Congress, two Secretaries of State are from Future Republic: Nicola Renzi as Secretary of State for Foreign, Political Affairs and Justice and Marco Podeschi as Secretary of State for Education, Culture, University, Justice, Research, Information, Sport, Innovation and Relations with the Azienda Autonoma di Stato per i Servizi Pubblici.

Following this electoral success, the two parties decided in February 2017 to merge and create a new party.

Future Republic is a member of the European Democratic Party.

Electoral history

References

External links
Official website

2017 establishments in San Marino
Centrist parties in Europe
European Democratic Party
Liberal parties in San Marino
Political parties established in 2017
Political parties in San Marino
Pro-European political parties in San Marino